The R325 road is a regional road in County Mayo and County Roscommon in Ireland.

The government legislation that defines the R325, the Roads Act 1993 (Classification of Regional Roads) Order 2012 (Statutory Instrument 54 of 2012), provides the following official description:

Glentavraun, County Mayo — Cloonarragh, County Roscommon

Between its junction with N83 at Glentavraun in the county of Mayo and its junction with R361 at Cloonarragh in the county of Roscommon via Sonvolaun and Kilmovee in the county of Mayo: Crunaun, Kiltybranks and Loughglinn in the county of Roscommon.

See also
 List of roads of County Mayo
 National primary road
 National secondary road
 Regional road
 Roads in Ireland

References

Regional roads in the Republic of Ireland
Roads in County Mayo